Yurlinsky District is an administrative district (raion) of Komi-Permyak Okrug of Perm Krai, Russia; one of the thirty-three in the krai. As a municipal division, it is incorporated as Yurlinsky Municipal District. It is located in the west of the krai. Its administrative center is the rural locality (a selo) of Yurla. Population:  The population of Yurla accounts for 42.6% of the district's total population.

Geography
Over 80% of the district's territory is covered by forests.

History
The district was established on January 7, 1924.

Demographics
Ethnic composition (as of the 2002 Census):
Russians: 95.8%
Komi-Permyak people: 3%

Economy
The economy of the district is based on forestry, timber industry, and agriculture.

References

Notes

Sources

Districts of Perm Krai
Komi-Permyak Okrug
States and territories established in 1924